Trent is a surname and a male given name, and means "the flooder". It is generally associated with the River Trent, a river in Britain. It may also be a short form of the given name Trenton.

People

Given name 
 Trent Alexander-Arnold (born 1998), English footballer
 Trenton Trent Ashby (born 1972, American politician
 Trent Barrett (born 1977), Australian rugby league coach and former player
 Trent Blank (born 1989), American baseball coach
 Trent Boult (born 1989), New Zealand international cricketer
 Trent Cole (born 1982), American retired National Football League player
 Trent Copeland (born 1986), Australian cricketer and commentator
 Trent Croad (born 1980), retired Australian rules footballer
 Trent Cotchin (born 1990), Australian rules footballer
 Trent D'Antonio (born 1985), Australian baseball player
 Trent Dawson (born 1971), American actor
 Trent Dilfer (born 1972), American retired National Football League quarterback and analyst
 Trent Dimas (born 1970), American retired gymnast and Olympic champion
 Trent Edwards (born 1983), American retired National Football League quarterback
 Trent Ford (born 1979), American-born English actor and model
 Trent Franks (born 1957), American politician and businessman
 Trent Frederic (born 1998), American National Hockey League player
 Trent Gamble (born 1977), American retired National Football League player
 Trent Gardner (1961–2016), American rock musician and producer
 Trent Green (born 1970), American retired National Football League quarterback
 Trent Grisham (born 1996), American Major League Baseball player
 Trenton Trent Guy (born 1987), American football player
 Trenton Trent Harmon (born 1990), American musician, winner of the fifteenth and final season of American Idol
 Trent Harris (born 1952), American independent filmmaker
 Trent Harris (American football) (born 1995), American football player
 Trent Hodkinson (born 1988), Australian retired rugby league footballer
 Trent Hunter (born 1980), Canadian retired National Hockey League player
 Trent Johnson (born 1956), American college basketball coach
 Trent Klasna (born 1969), American former road bicycle racer
 Trent Kowalik (born 1995), American actor, dancer and singer
 Trent Kynaston (born 1946), American jazz and classical saxophonist
 Trent Lott (born 1941), U.S. Senator from Mississippi 
 Trent Lowe (born 1984), Australian cyclist
 Trent McCleary (born 1972), Canadian retired National Hockey League player
 Trent Oeltjen (born 1983), Australian former Major League Baseball player
 Trent Plaisted (born 1986), American retired basketball player
 Trent Reznor (born 1965), American musician and frontman of Nine Inch Nails
 Trenton Trent Richardson (born 1990), American football running back
 Trent Robinson (born 1977), Australian rugby league coach and former player
 Trenton Trent Scott (born 1994), American National Football League player
 Trent Sherfield (born 1996), American National Football League player
 Trent Sieg (born 1995), American National Football League player
 Trent Smith (born 1979), American football player
 Trent Taylor (born 1994), American National Football League player
 Trent Thornton (born 1993), American baseball player
 Trent Tomlinson (born 1975), American country singer-songwriter
 Trent Tucker (born 1959), American retired National Basketball Association player
 Trent Whitfield (born 1977), Canadian ice hockey coach and former player
 Trent Williams (born 1988), American National Football League player
 Trent Willmon (born 1973), American country artist and songwriter
 Trent Yawney, Canadian hockey coach and former player

Surname 
 Derek Trent (born 1980), American former figure skater
 Djuan Trent (born 1986), American model
 Gary Trent (born 1974), American retired National Basketball Association player
 Horace M. Trent (1907–1964), American physicist
 Jackie Trent (1940–2015), English singer-songwriter
 John Trent (actor) (1906–1966), American aviator and actor
 John Trent (author), American author of marriage and family books
 John Trent (director) (1935–1983), British-born Canadian film director
 Lawrence Trent (born 1986), English chess player
 Robert H. Trent (1936–2012), American state legislator and mining engineer
 Sybil Trent (1926–2000), American actress
 Tererai Trent (born c. 1965), Zimbabwean philanthropist
 William Trent (1715–1787), colonial American fur trader and merchant, founder of Trenton, New Jersey

Fictional characters
 Trent Crimm, in the television series Ted Lasso
 Trent Easton, in the video game franchise Perfect Dark
 Trent Fernandez, White Dino Ranger from Power Rangers: Dino Thunder
 Trent Lane, in the MTV animated series Daria
 Edison Trent, main character of the video game Freelancer
 Nell Trent, heroine of Charles Dickens' The Old Curiosity Shop
 Philip Trent, gentleman sleuth of the E.C. Bentley novels
 Zoe Trent, in the 2012 animated series Littlest Pet Shop
 Trent, one of the Magicians of Xanth
 Trent (Total Drama Island), in the Canadian animated series Total Drama 
 Trent Maddock, in the CW television series Crazy Ex-Girlfriend
 Trent Walker, in the 1996 film Swingers, portrayed by Vince Vaughn
 Kurtis Trent, the secondary protagonist of the 2003 video game Tomb Raider: The Angel of Darkness

See also 
 Trent (disambiguation)

References 

English masculine given names
English given names
Hypocorisms